King of Champa is the title ruler of Champa. Champa rulers often use two Hinduist style titles: raja-di-raja ( "king of kings"; written here in Devanagari since the Cham used their own Cham script) or po-tana-raya ("lord of all territories").

The regnal name of the Champa rulers originated from the Hindu tradition, often consisting of titles and aliases. Titles (prefix) like: Jaya ( "victory"), Maha ( "great"), Sri ( "glory"). Aliases (stem) like: Bhadravarman, Vikrantavarman, Rudravarman, Simhavarman, Indravarman, Paramesvaravarman, Harivarman... Among them, the suffix -varman belongs to the Kshatriya class and is only for those leaders of the Champa Alliance.

The last king of Champa was deposed by Minh Mạng in 1832.

List of kings of Champa

Lâm Ấp (Linyi)

Chiêm Thành (Zhancheng)

Panduranga

See also
 History of Champa
 Maharaja
 King of Kings

References

 Ðặt lại vấn đề về biên niên sử Champa

 
Heads of state
Royal titles